Okroglice is a settlement in the hills northeast of Loka pri Zidanem Mostu in the Municipality of Sevnica in east-central Slovenia. The area is part of the historical region of Styria. The municipality is now included in the Lower Sava Statistical Region. 

The local church is dedicated to Saint Lawrence and belongs to the Parish of Razbor. It dates to the early 18th century.

References

External links

Okroglice at Geopedia

Populated places in the Municipality of Sevnica